Charles Fuqua Manuel Jr. (born January 4, 1944), is an American former professional baseball player, coach, and manager. During his playing career, he appeared over parts of six Major League Baseball seasons for the Minnesota Twins and Los Angeles Dodgers, before playing another six seasons in Nippon Professional Baseball with the Yakult Swallows and Kintetsu Buffaloes. Over four successive seasons in NPB, Manuel hit at least .312 with 37 home runs each season and won the 1979 Pacific League Most Valuable Player Award. After his playing career, he coached and managed the Cleveland Indians and managed the Philadelphia Phillies, winning the 2008 World Series over the Tampa Bay Rays and the 2009 National League Championship Series over the Los Angeles Dodgers. He was inducted to the Philadelphia Baseball Wall of Fame in 2014. On August 13, 2019, Manuel replaced John Mallee as hitting coach for the Phillies for the remainder of the season.

Early life
Although Manuel was born in Northfork, West Virginia, his family was actually living in Virginia at that time, and he lived in Virginia throughout his childhood. He was born in an automobile while his mother, June, was visiting her mother. Manuel's father, Charles Sr., was a Pentecostal preacher, and the family lived in Wythe and Grayson Counties in Virginia until they settled in Buena Vista, Virginia, when Charlie, the third of 11 children and the oldest son, was 12.

Manuel became a four-sport star at Parry McCluer High School in Buena Vista, playing baseball, football, basketball, and track and field, captaining the baseball and basketball teams. His first love was basketball and he had received scholarship offers in that sport, but his plans and his life would dramatically change just before his high school graduation.

In April 1963, Manuel's father committed suicide due to being severely ill with diabetes and heart problems. Leaving behind a suicide note, he asked that Charlie – who was already married with a child – take care of his mother and siblings.

Playing career

Minor league career
In 1971, Manuel hit .372/.462/.764 for the Portland Beavers, leading the International League in each category. In 1974, he batted .329/.433/.600 with 30 home runs and 102 RBIs for the Albuquerque Dukes in the Pacific Coast League. Over 11 seasons in the minor leagues, in 3,430 at bats, Manuel batted .290/.374/.483 with 133 home runs and 624 RBIs.

Major league career
His earliest Topps baseball cards listed him as, “Chuck” Manuel. He batted .198 in 384 at bats.

Japanese baseball

Manuel's baseball career took off when he left the United States to play in Japan. Wildly popular for his tenacious style of play and his power-hitting abilities, Manuel was dubbed "Aka-Oni" (The Red Devil) by fans and teammates.

In 1977, he hit .316/.403/.690 (2nd in the league) with 42 home runs (3rd) and 97 runs batted in (5th), helping the Central League's Yakult Swallows reach second place for the first time in franchise history. In 1978, he hit .312/.372/.596 with 39 homers (3rd in the league) and 103 RBIs (5th), powering the Swallows to their first pennant and the Japan Championship Series.

Playing for the Pacific League's Kintetsu Buffaloes, Manuel hit 25 home runs in the first eight weeks of the 1979 season. He was on pace to break the Japanese record of 16 home runs in a month. At a game against the Lotte Orions on June 19, 1979, he was beaned by a pitch from Soroku Yagisawa, effectively stopping Manuel from breaking that record. The pitch broke Manuel's jaw in six places. He was wearing a dental bridge, as a result of an earlier accident in the minor leagues. There was nothing for doctors to wire together, so they inserted three metal plates in his head and removed nerves from his face. Manuel was discharged from the hospital after six weeks and immediately began playing again, against the advice of doctors and worried family. The Buffaloes were struggling to stay in the Pacific League lead and had never won a pennant. To protect his jaw, Manuel wore a helmet equipped with a football facemask. He wore the helmet for the first few games but stopped using it because it obscured his vision at the plate. He finished the 1979 season with 37 home runs to win the home run title. He led Kintetsu to its first pennant win. He was voted the Most Valuable Player, the first American to receive the honor since 1964, hitting .324/.434 (2nd in the league)/.712 (leading the league) with 65 walks (2nd), 37 home runs (leading the league) and 94 RBIs (5th).

A year later, Manuel shocked Japanese baseball by leaving for a week to attend his son's high school graduation in Virginia. His contract allowed it, but team officials were incredulous that Manuel would leave the team two games out of first place with three weeks to play in the first half of the season. Manuel returned to lead the team to the second-half championship and the pennant. He finished the season hitting .325 (5th in the league)/.400/.673 (leading the league), with 88 runs (4th), 48 home runs (leading the league), and 129 RBIs (leading the league). It was the best season for an American player in Japan to that point. Manuel won no awards that season.

In 1981, he returned to the Yakult Swallows after being released by Kintetsu over contract negotiations.

Manuel finished his successful run in Japan with a .303 career average, 189 home runs, and 491 RBIs. He was considered one of the best imported baseball players to Japan in those days, along with brothers Leron and Leon Lee and Randy Bass.

During his time in Japan, Manuel learned to speak Japanese. The language skill and experience in Japan were useful back in the U.S. for managing players such as So Taguchi and Tadahito Iguchi.

Managing career

Minor league manager

Ultimately, injuries, including his beaning in Japan, cut Manuel's playing days short. He returned to the United States to work as a scout for the Minnesota Twins organization before turning to coaching.  As a minor league manager for nine years in the Twins' (–) and Cleveland Indians' (–) farm systems, Manuel compiled a 610–588 (.509) record, winning the Pacific Coast League and International League championships in his final two seasons (–93). He was named Manager of the Year three times (1992) and managed the IL All-Star team in 1993.

Cleveland Indians coach and manager
Manuel returned to the Majors in 1988 as the Indians' hitting coach (–, –), where under his tutelage, the Tribe led the American League in runs three times (1994–, 1999) and set a franchise record in 1999 with 1,009 runs, becoming the first team to score 1,000 runs since the 1950 Boston Red Sox. The club also led the league in home runs in 1994 and 1995. He was the 37th manager in Indians history.

He was fired as manager of the Cleveland Indians on July 12, 2002, over a contract dispute. He finished with a record of 220 wins and 190 losses.

Philadelphia Phillies manager

2004–06
Shortly after he was fired as manager for the Cleveland Indians, Manuel was hired by the Philadelphia Phillies as special assistant to the general manager. After the  season, Manuel was hired as the club's 51st manager, replacing Larry Bowa.  In the 2005 season, the Phillies went 88–74, only one game back of the Wild Card.

In , the Phillies finished just short of the playoffs once again, this time three games back of the wild card.  However, the season did have certain positives that boded well for next season.  Second-year slugger Ryan Howard hit a franchise-record 58 home runs, second baseman Chase Utley was named a starter in the 2006 MLB All-Star Game, and rookie pitcher Cole Hamels showed progress and the potential to one day become the club's ace.

2007
The team got off to a slow start again in 2007 (in 2005, they opened at 9–12; in 2006, 6–10). They began the season with a 3–9 record and during the Phillies' post-game press conference following the team's 8–1 loss to the New York Mets on April 17, 2007, Philadelphia radio personality Howard Eskin repeatedly questioned Manuel why he did not challenge his players. Eskin, a controversial afternoon drive host on local sports-talk station WIP-610, had criticized Manuel since the manager's hiring three years earlier. The Phillies proceeded to lose two of their next three games after the confrontation before going on a five-game winning streak. After the streak, the Phillies took another step back, winning only 5 of their next 13 games. The Philles were still one game below .500 on July 19 and only four games over .500 on August 25. From August 25 through the end of the season the Phillies went 23–11 to overtake the Mets.

Manuel's Phillies battled injuries all season, including losing newly acquired pitcher Freddy García for the season. Howard, Utley, and Hamels also missed significant playing time. Hamels led the pitching staff with a 15–5 record, while Jimmy Rollins set the Major League Baseball record for at bats in a season with 716 through all 162 games played, and was named NL MVP.  In a dramatic finale to the season, the Phillies captured the National League East title from the collapsing Mets, but were swept in the first round of the playoffs by the Colorado Rockies. Manuel finished second in balloting for the National League Manager of the Year Award for 2007.

2008–09
The 2008 season started out much like 2005 through 2007, as the Phillies once again got off to a slow start with a record of 8 wins and 10 losses. They recovered quickly after their slow start to go over the .500 mark on April 24. They peaked at 22 games over the .500 mark on the final day of the season, winning 92 games and earning 1st place in the NL East for the second consecutive year. On October 29, Manuel guided the 2008 Phillies to their second world title. It was his first World Series ring after years of close calls (including the 1997 Cleveland Indians).  He was voted by fans as MLB "This Year in Baseball Awards" Manager of the Year. Manuel reached a contract agreement with the Phils on December 9, 2008, to keep him with the team through the 2011 season. 

On October 21, 2009, Manuel became the first manager in franchise history to lead the Phillies to two consecutive World Series appearances. It was the first time a National League team won back-to-back pennants since the 1995–96 Atlanta Braves. During the 2009 World Series, Manuel was criticized for not pitching Cliff Lee in Game 4, a game the Phillies eventually lost. He defended his decision by noting that Lee had never pitched on three days' rest before. Manuel finished sixth in balloting for the 2009 National League Manager of the Year Award.

2010–11
In 2010, Manuel managed the Phillies to their fourth consecutive NL East title. The Phillies became the third NL team in history to play in the postseason in four consecutive seasons, joining the Braves (1991–1995, excluding 1994) and the New York Giants (1921–24). The Phillies finished the season at 97–65; it was the first time in franchise history that Philadelphia had completed a season with Major League Baseball's best record. In November, the Rotary Club  of Pittsburgh named Manuel the recipient of its Chuck Tanner Major League Baseball Manager of the Year Award. However, the Phillies would be eliminated by the eventual World Series champion San Francisco Giants in the NLCS.

In September 2011, Manuel again led the Phillies to the NL East title, their fifth consecutive in as many years, and quickest post-season clinch ever: at game #150. During the sweep of the final series against the Atlanta Braves on September 26–28, records were set. First on the 26th, with the Phillies' 4–2 victory, he became the second manager in Phillies' history to manage a team to at least 100 wins in a season, after Danny Ozark during back-to-back 101-win seasons in 1976 and 1977. The next day, with the Phillies' 7–1 victory, Manuel moved into a franchise-record tie with Gene Mauch with 645 regular-season victories. In the final game of the season with a victory in 13 innings, he led the Phillies to a franchise-record 102 regular season wins. With the victory he picked up his 646th win, setting a new Phillies' managerial record for victories and assuring that the Phillies would face the red-hot St. Louis Cardinals, who defeated them in the NLDS.

2012–13
In 2012, he managed the Phillies to an 81–81 record. It marked the first time in five years the team failed to reach the postseason. 

In 2013, Manuel won his 1,000th game on August 12. However, Manuel did not win another game with the Phillies, and after the team lost their 15th game out of 20 after the All-Star Break, Manuel was fired on August 16. He was replaced by third-base coach Ryne Sandberg. Reaction around the league and from the Phillies fan base mostly consisted of sadness and gratitude to Manuel for his tenure. Several Phillies veterans, including Chase Utley and Cole Hamels, expressed regret and guilt, believing their lack of production led to Manuel's firing; they said that they viewed Manuel as a fatherly figure. Sandberg commented the next day, "It was a roller coaster of a day emotionally. It affected me and I think it affects the players." Manuel received praise from the media for his class in handling the situation, and sportswriters mostly exonerated him of the blame for the Phillies' performance, focusing on his not having had better players. When asked if he had enough pieces to win the last two years, he said "The last two years? No. I can straight face tell you that." He finished with a record of 780 wins and 636 losses. Of the six managers to have lasted for twelve seasons in the position in Major League Baseball, Manuel is the only one to have won 1,000 games. He is also one of just a dozen managers to have won a thousand games without having also lost a thousand as well (of those, six are in the Hall of Fame). Despite stepping down, Manuel returned to the Philles in 2019 as a senior advisor to the General Manager.

Philadelphia Phillies hitting coach

2019
On August 13, 2019, he was hired as the hitting coach of the Phillies, replacing John Mallee.

Managerial record

Personal life

Manuel has survived a heart attack, quadruple bypass surgery, a blocked and infected colon, and kidney cancer.  During his time with the Indians, he worked in the dugout with a colostomy bag beneath his jacket. 

Manuel's mother June died on October 10, 2008, at age 87, in Buena Vista, Virginia. She had suffered a heart attack earlier in the week. 

In 2015, he was married to his wife, Melissa "Missy" Martin. He lives with his wife in Florida. He has two children, Chuck and Julie; three step-children, Collin, Hailey and Allie; and five grandchildren.

See also

 List of Major League Baseball managers by wins

References

External links

 
 
 Charlie Manuel at SABR (Baseball BioProject)
 Charlie Manuel at Baseball Almanac
 Charlie Manuel at Baseballbiography.com
 Charlie Manuel Philadelphia Phillies Bio

1944 births
Living people
Albuquerque Dukes players
American expatriate baseball players in Japan
Baseball players from Virginia
Baseball players from West Virginia
Charlotte Hornets (baseball) players
Cleveland Indians coaches
Cleveland Indians managers
Colorado Springs Sky Sox managers
Evansville Triplets players
Florida Instructional League Twins players
Kintetsu Buffaloes players
Los Angeles Dodgers players
Major League Baseball outfielders
Minnesota Twins players
Nippon Professional Baseball designated hitters
Nippon Professional Baseball MVP Award winners
Orlando Twins players
People from Buena Vista, Virginia
People from Grayson County, Virginia
People from Northfork, West Virginia
People from Wythe County, Virginia
Portland Beavers players
Philadelphia Phillies coaches
Philadelphia Phillies managers
Portland Beavers managers
Sportspeople from Winter Haven, Florida
Tacoma Twins players
Toledo Mud Hens managers
Wisconsin Rapids Twins players
Wytheville Twins players
Yakult Swallows players
World Series-winning managers